

History
The University of Oklahoma College of Medicine was founded in 1900 as a medical department of the University of Oklahoma at its main campus in Norman.  Lawrence N. Upjohn, M.D. is regarded as the "founding dean" and served from 1900-1904.  In 1910, the school merged with the Epworth College of Medicine in Oklahoma City.  By 1928, all basic science and clinical facilities had been consolidated as what would become the University of Oklahoma Health Sciences Center in Oklahoma City, where there was a growing urban population and larger hospital facilities could be supported.  By the 1960s, the College and its affiliated hospitals had grown into a large, traditional academic medical center.  In 1974, a geographically separate, community-based clinical campus was established in Tulsa, approximately 100 miles northeast of the main campus. Referred to as the OU College of Medicine, the college is the only medical school in Oklahoma that grants the Doctor of Medicine (M.D.) degree.

The College of Medicine has approximately 650 students enrolled in the M.D. degree program.  The entering first-year class size increased from 150 to 165 in 2006.  A small number of medical students enroll in a combined M.D./Ph.D. degree program.  Previously all medical students spent their first two years at the Oklahoma City campus and at the end of the second year, up to a quarter of each class may elect to complete their third and fourth years clinical experiences at the Tulsa community-based campus. Beginning in 2015 the School of Community Medicine in Tulsa expanded to a full 4-year campus and students had the opportunity to apply to either or both the Oklahoma City main campus medical school, and/or the School of Community Medicine branch campus in Tulsa. The first class having spent all four years of medical training at the Tulsa School of Community Medicine graduated in 2019. In addition to medical students, the college has more than 140 graduate students working on doctoral degrees in the biomedical sciences and 170 students enrolled in its physician assistant program.

Admissions
Applications are processed through AMCAS and must be submitted by October 15. The minimum scores to apply are a 3.0 GPA and a 21 on the MCAT, however the average scores of students accepted are much higher and fluctuate from year to year.

The school has the third highest yield out of all Medical Schools in the United States.

Academics
OU College of Medicine has 17 clinical departments and 4 basic science departments at the Oklahoma City campus.

Facilities

The College sponsors residency and fellowship training in 74 specialities and subspecialties of medicine and has approximately 755 residents/fellows in training. The major teaching hospitals affiliated with the College in Oklahoma City are the OU Medical Center, The Children's Hospital, and the VA Medical Center. The faculty practice is known as OU Physicians and includes virtually every medical and surgical specialty and subspecialty. In 2008, the new umbrella brand "OU Medicine" was released to reflect the entire enterprise that encompasses the OU College of Medicine, OU Medical Center, The Children's Hospital, OU Physicians and the University Hospitals Authority & Trust.

At the Tulsa campus, known as the Schusterman Center, programs are affiliated with three hospitals:  Hillcrest Medical Center, Saint Francis Hospital, and St. John Medical Center. In 2008, the University announced that the Tulsa campus of the College of Medicine would become the OU School of Community Medicine within the College of Medicine. A separate educational track was developed and implemented with a special focus on Community Medicine.  On December 1, 2009, OU and the University of Tulsa announced that the two universities would collaborate to create a four-year medical school in Tulsa. In 2019 the OU Tulsa School of Community Medicine graduated its first class of 30 students who had spent the entire 4-years of medical training at the Tulsa branch campus.

See also
Medical facilities in Tulsa

References

External links
 

Universities and colleges in Oklahoma City
Medical schools in Oklahoma
Medicine
Educational institutions established in 1900
1900 establishments in Oklahoma Territory